Stig Holmqvist (13 February 1936 – 6 April 2020) was a Finnish footballer. He played in 20 matches for the Finland national football team from 1959 to 1965.

References

External links
 

1936 births
2020 deaths
Finnish footballers
Finland international footballers
Association footballers not categorized by position
Swedish-speaking Finns
Footballers from Helsinki
HIFK Fotboll players
Helsingin Jalkapalloklubi players